RTL Nieuws is a Dutch television news service produced by RTL Nederland. The national and international news service produces 17 bulletins each weekday and six weekend bulletins for RTL4 and RTL Z, reaching a total audience of about 1.5 million people. With the evening broadcast sometimes reaching over 2 million viewers.

RTL Nieuws' main competitor is NOS Journaal, broadcast by the Nederlandse Omroep Stichting (Dutch Broadcasting Foundation) for public service television and radio. RTL co-operates primarily with the Flemish commercial television channel VTM and RTL Germany for international news coverage.

Bulletins 
On weekdays, at 6:30am and on the hour and half hour between 7am & 9am, RTL Onbijtnieuws (RTL Breakfast News) bulletins are broadcast on RTL 4. An hourly daytime service of 15-minute bulletins airs on RTLZ between 8am and 5:30pm, featuring business news round-ups and 'normal' news.

Seven days a week, three evening bulletins air on RTL4 in the form of a short 6pm bulletin, a main evening 20-minute programme at 7:30pm and a 10-minute late night bulletin at varying times. The Sunday edition of the 7:30pm news also features a short review of the past week's events.

In addition, RTL Nieuws produces an hourly daytime service called RTL Z combining news bulletins and business & financial updates on weekdays. A topical magazine programme, Editie NL, is also broadcast each weekday evening on RTL 4.

On-air team

RTL Ontbijtnieuws (RTL Breakfast News) (6.30–9.05) (RTL 4)

Former presenters
 Selma van Dijk (relief; 1998–2003)
 Geert Gordijn (relief; 2008, 2012–2013)
 Elizabeth Heijkoop (relief; 2000–2002)
 Rob Hessing (main; 1990–1993)
 Jan de Hoop (main; 1989-2022)
 Marc Jacobs (main; 1990–1995)
 Daphne Lammers (relief; 2012–2013)
 Jeroen Latijnhouwers (relief; 1998-2000, 2012-2014)
 Pascalle Luycks (relief; 2005–2008)
 Diana Matroos (relief; 2012–2013)
 Riks Ozinga (relief; 1999–2002)
 Diana Sno (relief; 2000–2002)
 Sanne Staarink (main: 2011-2019)
 Femke Wolthuis (main; 2002–2011)
 Peter van Zadelhoff (relief; 2011–2012)

RTL Z Nieuws (8.00–17.55) (RTL Z)

Former presenters
 Sanne Boswinkel (2005-2019)
 Hella Hueck (2008-2015)
 Marc de Jong (relief; 2008-2019)
 Elianne Kuepers (2016-2017)
 Jeroen Latijnhouwers (1997–2003)
 Pascalle Luycks (2005–2008)
 Peter van der Maat (2001–2005)
 Diana Matroos (2004-2016)
 Jaap van Meekren (1989–1993)
 Antoin Peeters (2001–2003)
 Esther van Rijswijk (2004)
 Guikje Roethof (2002)
 Loretta Schrijver (2001–2007)
 Nico Steenbergen (2001–2008)
 Margreet Spijker (relief; 2012–2013)
 Roderick Veelo (main; 2005-2018)
Peter van Zadelhoff (main; 2008-2015)

Editie NL (18.15–18.35) (RTL 4)

Former presenters
Wilson Boldewijn (main early bulletin; 2007-2015)
Roel Geeraedts (main late bulletin; 2004–2005)
Petra Grijzen (relief early bulletin; 2012)
Elsemieke Havenga (main early bulletin; 2003–2006)
Jan de Hoop (relief early bulletin; 2003–2007)
Brecht van Hulten (relief early bulletin; 2010)
Roland Koopman (relief late bulletin; 2005)
Daphne Lammers (main late bulletin; 2004–2005, main early bulletin; 2007–2014)
Jeroen Latijnhouwers (main early bulletin; 2003-2014)
Pernille La Lau (relief early bulletin; 2006–2008)
Diana Matroos (relief early bulletin; 2013-2016)
Daan Nieber (main early bulletin; 2014-2016)
Margreet Spijker (main early bulletin; 2003–2011)
Peter van Zadelhoff (relief early bulletin; 2012-2015)

RTL Nieuws (18.00, 19.30, Late) (RTL 4)

Former presenters
Vivian Boelen (1991–1995) (main presenter)
Suzanne Bosman (1999–2013) (main presenter)
Sanne Boswinkel (2007-2015) (relief presenter)
Selma van Dijk (1998–2003) (Late)
Elsemieke Havenga (2002–2003) (main presenter)
Elizabeth Heijkoop (2000–2002) (at Sunday)
Roelof Hemmen (2003-2016) (main presenter)
Roland Koopman (1999–2001) (at Six)
Leo de Later (1989–1999) (main presenter)
Jeroen Latijnhouwers (1998–2003) (main presenter)
Diana Matroos (2013-2016) (relief presenter)
Jaap van Meekren (1989–1993) (at Six)
Rick Nieman (1996-2015) (main presenter) 
Edvard Niessing (1995–1998) (Late)
Jeroen Pauw (1989–2000) (main presenter)
Loretta Schrijver (1989–2000, 2001–2007) (main presenter)
Sander Simons (1989–1999) (Late)
Margreet Spijker (1998–2014) (main presenter)
Sanne Staarink (2015-2019) (main at Sunday and relief presenter)
Mariëlle Tweebeeke (2007–2010) (main presenter)
Margriet Vroomans (1994–1998) (main presenter)
Merel Westrik (2014-2019) (main presenter)
Peter van Zadelhoff (2015) (relief presenter)

RTL Weather (RTL 4/RTL Z)

Former presenters
John Bernard (1989–2002)
Laura van der Blij (2013)
Heleen de Boer (1989–1991)
Jennifer Faber (2014-2018)
Helga van Leur (1997-2017)
Amara Onwuka (2013-2019)
Harry Otten (1989–2000)
Margot Ribberink (1993-2014)
Peter Timofeeff (1996-2015)
Dennis Wilt (2008-2019)

Correspondents 

Politics

Fons Lambie
Roel Schreinemachers
Marieke van de Zilver

Floor Bremer
Frits Wester

National

Silvia Brens
Reinoud Broekhuijsen (Internet) 
Hans de Bruijn (Economics)
Pepijn Crone
Jaap van Deurzen
Merijn Doggen (Technologies)
Betty Glas
Geert Gordijn
Peper Hofstede (Sports)
Rick Konijnenbelt

Marcel Maijer (Sports)
Olivia Manders (Economics)
Jildou van Opzeeland
Sander Paulus (Royalty)
Koen de Regt (Research)
Britta Sanders
Hans Schutte
Tuur Verdonck
Jeroen Wetzels (Justice) 
Hester van Yperen (Research)

International

Jeroen Akkermans (2001–present; Germany, Eastern Europe & Caucasus, 1989-1995; Russia, 1996-2001; The United Kingdom)
Niels Guns (2014–present; South Asia)
Saskia Houttuin (2018–present; Africa)
Olaf Koens (2015–present; Middle East & Turkey, 2011-2015; Russia)
Sandra Korstjens (2013–present; South America)

Erik Mouthaan (2006–present; North & Central America)
Eveline Rethmeier (2015–present; Greece, Italy, Malta & Vatican)
Anne Saenen (2015–present; The United Kingdom)
Martijn Smiers (2018–present; Russia)
Alex Tieleman (2015–present; Portugal & Spain)
Stefan de Vries (2006–present; France)

Former international correspondents

Michiel Bicker Caarten (1989-1991; The United States) 
Emma Blijdenstein (2001-2007; Israel) 
Silvia Brens (2002-2006; South Africa and 2009-2014; Southeast Europe & Turkey)
Reinoud Broekhuijsen (1995-2007; Russia)
Sjoerd den Daas (2018-2019; China and East Asia)
Fidan Ekiz (2005-2007; Turkey)
Roel Geeraedts (2011-2015; Middle East)
Nina Jurna (2000-2010; Surinam and 2011-2013; South America)
Marloes de Koning (2014-2016; Southeast Europe & Turkey)
Vanessa Lamsvelt (2010-2015; The United Kingdom)

Arthur de Leeuw (2008-2014; Africa)
Len Middelbeek (1995-1997; Germany)
Conny Mus † (1989-2010; Israel & The Middle East)
Koen de Regt (2014-2017; Africa)
Esther van Rijswijk (2001-2004; The United Kingdom)
Carolien van Tilburg (Japan)
Pauline Valkenet (1991-1993; Russia, 1995-1998; The United Kingdom and 2000-2015; Italy, Malta & Vatican
Marije Vlaskamp (2003-2017; Far East)
Max Westerman (1989-1991; Germany & Eastern Europe and 1991-2006; USA & Canada)

External links 

 

Dutch television news shows
1990s Dutch television series
2000s Dutch television series
2010s Dutch television series
RTL 4 original programming